Jacobus Cornelis Bloem (25 February 1822, in Tilburg – 1 September 1902, in The Hague)  was a Dutch politician.

See also
List of Dutch politicians

1822 births
1902 deaths
Ministers of Finance of the Netherlands
Dutch civil servants
People from Tilburg